This is a list of operatic sopranos and mezzo-sopranos who were born in Sweden or whose work is closely associated with that country.

A
Eufrosyne Abrahamson (1836–1869), soprano who performed in operas mainly in Madrid and Vienna
Adèle Almati (1861–1919), German-born Swedish mezzo-soprano who performed leading roles at the Royal Swedish Opera
Ruth Althén (1890–1985), soprano at the Royal Swedish Opera, concert performer
Vendela Andersson-Sörensen (1860–1926), soprano at the Royal Swedish Opera from 1882 to 1887
Susanna Andersson (born 1977), soprano opera singer, performing internationally in opera and recitals
Lovisa Augusti (c.1751–1790), German-born Swedish soprano who made her mark at the Royal Swedish Opera
Kerstin Avemo (born 1973), coloratura soprano performing in opera houses and concert halls throughout Europe

B
Maria Bengtsson (born 1975), soprano performing in Europe's major opera houses
Julie Berwald (1822–1877), celebrated opera and concert singer, at the Royal Swedish Opera from 1847
Irma Björck (1898–1993), mezzo-soprano opera and operetta singer at the Royal Swedish Opera
Olga Björkegren (1857–1950), actress at the Swedish Theatre and singer at the Royal Swedish Opera
Anna-Lisa Björling (1910–2006), soprano opera singer and actress, performing at the Royal Swedish Opera from 1948
Karin Branzell (1891–1974}, mezzo-soprano at the New York Metropolitan Opera and in Europe, noted for Wagnerian roles
Ingela Brimberg (born 1964), soprano and mezzo-soprano opera singer who has performed in Sweden, Germany and Belgium
Malin Byström (born 1973), soprano performing leading roles in Europe's major opera houses

C
Sara Cahier (1870–1951), American-born Swedish mezzo-soprano in opera and lieder, performed in Europe and New York
Justina Casagli (1794–1841), soprano at the Royal Swedish Opera, also performed in Italy and Germany
Julia Claussen (1879–1941), mezzo-soprano with the Royal Swedish Opera, also in London, Paris and the United States

D
Tove Dahlberg (born 1973), mezzo-soprano with Royal Swedish Opera, also in London and the United States
Kjerstin Dellert (1925–2018), soprano with the Royal Swedish opera, later theatre manager
Katija Dragojevic (born 1970), mezzo-soprano and recitalist active across Europe

E
Mathilda Ebeling (1826–1851), concert pianist and soprano opera singer, performed at the Royal Swedish Opera and the Royal Opera in Berlin

Dina Edling (1854–1935), mezzo-soprano with the Royal Swedish Opera from 1877 to 1892 
Selma Ek (1856–1941), leading soprano of her day, remembered for her roles in the operas of Mozart, Verdi and Wagner
Wilhelmina Enbom (1804–1880), notable Swedish soprano in the 1830s at the Royal Swedish Opera
Mathilda Enequist (1833–1898), opera singer and singing instructor known as Signora Biondini

F
Maria Fontosh (born 1976), Ukrainian-born Russian soprano now in Sweden, performing at the Royal Swedish Opera
Wilhelmina Fundin (1819–1911), soprano who sang at the Royal Swedish Opera for 30 years until 1871

G
Maria Gelhaar (1858–1920), soprano who performed with the Royal Swedish Opera from 1883
Mathilda Gelhaar (1814–1889), one of the most noted singers of the Swedish Opera in the 1840s and 1850s
Wilhelmina Gelhaar (1937–1923), soprano at Stockholm's Royal Theatre from 1857, known in particular for her coloratura roles
Mathilda Grabow (1852–1940), soprano considered to be one of the stars of Swedish opera in the late 19th century
Rosa Grünberg (1878–1960), actress and soprano singer, considered a prima donna of Swedish opera in the early 1900s
Ellen Gulbranson (1863–1947), soprano known for her roles in Wagnerian operas, also sang regualarly in Bayreuth

H
Margareta Hallin (1931–2020), coloratura soprano, composer and actress, joined the Royal Swedish Opera in 1956 and toured internationally
Malin Hartelius (born 1966), soprano who has performed mainly in Austria and Switzerland
Signe Hebbe (1837–1926), soprano who sang throughout Europe in opera and concerts, later voice instructor
Charlotte Hellekant born 1962), mezzo-soprano active in opera mainly on American stages
Davida Hesse-Lilienberg (1877–1964), soprano who performed leading roles with the Royal Swedish Opera until 1909
Cecilia Hjortsberg (born 1973), soprano who has sung at the Royal Danish Theatre since 2005
Thekla Hofer (1852–1938), operatic soprano in Stockholm, St Petersburg and Riga, voice teacher
Hannah Holgersson (born 1976), soprano who has performed mainly as a concert soloist

J
Agnes Janson (1861–1947), mezzo-soprano opera singer and recitalist, voice teacher in Australia from 1906
Busk Margit Jonsson (born 1929), soprano with the Royal Swedish Opera until 1983

K
Katarina Karnéus (born 1965), mezzo-soprano opera singer and recitalist, active first in the UK and New York, later in Sweden
Maria Keohane (bonr 1971), soloist who has performed in festivals throughout Europe and made many recordings
Anna Maria Klemming (1864–1889), soprano, short but successful career with the Royal Swedish Opera until her early death

L
Karin Langebo (1927–2019), soprano and harpist, active mainly in Sweden and Norway
Nanny Larsén-Todsen (1884–1982), soprano active in Stockholm, Milan, New York and Bayreuth, notable for her roles in Wagner's operas
Lisa Larsson (born 1967), soprano who has performed widely as a soloist in concerts and festivals
Catarina Ligendza (born 1937), soprano active mainly in German opera houses and in Bayreuth, known for her Wagnerian performances
Sofia Liljegren (1765–1795), Finnish-Swedish soprano who was a popular performer at the Royal Swedish Opera in the 1780s
Elisabeth Lillström (1717–1791), early Swedish actress who performed in stage plays and in comic opera roles as a soprano
Jenny Lind (1820–1887), highly regarded soprano, performed in Sweden, across Europe and in concerts throughout the United States
Berit Lindholm (born 1934), performed at Covent Garden and at the Metropolitan Opera, notable for roles in Wagner's operas
Göta Ljungberg (1893–1955), major Wagnerian soprano of the 1920s, sang throughout America and Europe
Magna Lykseth-Skogman (1874–1949), Norwegian-born Swedish soprano, prima donna of the Royal Swedish Opera

M
Marie Louise Marcadet (1758–1804), opera singer and stage actress active in Stockholm and Paris
Hillevi Martinpelto (born 1958), operatic soprano and recitalist performing in Sweden and internationally
Kerstin Meyer (1928–2020), mezzo-soprano opera and concert performer mainly in Stockholm, Hamburg and London
Louise Michaëli (1830–1875), prima donna soprano of the Royal Swedish opera, also successful in London
Caroline Müller (1755–1826), highly successful Danish mezzo-soprano first in Copenhagen and later in Stockholm

N
Birgit Nilsson (1918–2005), celebrated soprano in Sweden and internationally, best known for her roles in the operas of Wagner and Richard Strauss
Christina Nilsson (1843=1921), coloratura soprano, internationally successful, mainly in Paris, London, North America and Moscow
Henriette Nissen-Saloman (1819–1879), mezzo-soprano opera singer and pianist, active touring across Europe and engaged in Saint Petersburg
Birgit Nordin (1934–2022), soprano with the Royal Swedish Opera remembered for her Mozart roles

O
Elisabeth Olin (1740–1828), first prima donna of the Royal Swedish Opera from its inauguration in 1773
Augusta Öhrström-Renard (1856–1921), mezzo-soprano at the Royal Danish Theatre and the Metropolitan Opera, concerts in France and North America
Anna Oscàr (1875–1915), leading soprano at the Royal Swedish Opera in the early 20th century
Carolina Östberg (1853–1924), celebrated soprano at the Royal Swedish Opera in the late 19th century, also performed in Denmark, Germany and Norway
Anne Sofie von Otter (born 1955), mezzo-soprano opera performer, recitalist, and pop singer, with extensive discography

P
Gertrud Pålson-Wettergren (1897–1921), mezzo-soprano with the Royal Swedish Opera, also at the Metropolitan Opera and Covent Garden
Miah Persson (born 1969). soprano at the Royal Danish Opera and international concert performer

Q
Isa Quensel (1905–1981), actress and soprano at the Royal Swedish Opera, appeared in over 50 films, plays and operas

R
Christina Rahm (1763–1837), successful actress and soprano, active with the Stenborg Theatre Company in Stockholm
Signe Rappe-Welden (1879–1974), soprano in Sweden and abroad, Bach recitalist, voice teacher
Amalia Riégo (1850–1926), soprano with the Royal Danish Opera from 1872
Elin Rombo (born 1976), soprano performing in Sweden and internationally in opera and recitals

S
Hjördis Schymberg (1909–2008), coloratura and lyric soprano, active at the Royal Swedish Opera and internationally in recitals and operas
Anna Sofia Sevelin (1790–1871), initially alto, later soprano, highly active with the Royal Swedish Opera until 1833
Gitta-Maria Sjöberg (born 1957), Swedish-born soprano, soloist with the Royal Danish Theatre from 1987
Elisabeth Söderström (1927–2009), soprano remembered for her roles in the operas of Rachmaninoff and Sibelius in Sweden and internationally
Nina Stemme (born 1963), celebrated Wagnerian soprano, performing with opera companies across Europe and the United States
Fredrika Stenhammar (1836–1880), soprano with the Royal Swedish Opera, later voice instructor
Birgitta Svendén (born 1952), mezzo-soprano known for Wagnerian performances at the Royal Swedish Opera, Metropolitan Opera and Bayreuth
Erika Sunnegårdh (born 1966), soprano who has sung with the Metropolitan Opera as well as in Berlin, Malmö and Stockholm

T
Bertha Tammelin (1836–1915), actress, mezzo-soprano opera singer, pianist, composer and drama instructor
Iréne Theorin (born 1963), soprano in operas and recitals across Europe and in the United States, noted for her Wagnerian roles
Camilla Tilling (born 1971), soprano in opera and concert across Europe and in the United States
Ingrid Tobiasson (born 1951(mezzo-soprano singing leading roles at the Royal Swedish Opera, also concert recitalist and recording artist

W
Lilly Walleni (1875–1920), mezzo-soprano remembered for her Wagner role in German opera houses and Stockholm
Elisabeth Wärnfeldt (born 1956), soprano opera and concert singer, author of libretti
Jeanette Wässelius (1784–1853), leading prima donna of the Royal Swedish Opera in the early 19th century
Sara Widén (1981–2014), soprano with the Royal Swedish Opera until her early death from cancer
Henriette Widerberg (1796–1872), soprano, prima donna with the Royal Swedish Opera from 1820
Hedvig Wigert (1748–1780), early soprano performer with the Royal Swedish Opera from its inauguration in 1773
Zulamith Wellander (1857–1919), mezzo-soprano with the Royal Danish Opera, guest performer in Denmark and Germany, voice instructor

References

operatic sopranos
Swedish operatic sopranos
Swedish operatic sopranos